The Agnes was a wooden carvel cutter built in 1853 in Sydney Harbour. It was lost at Newcastle Bight, New South Wales, on 13 July 1860, when it was blown ashore in a gale whilst travelling between Newcastle and Sydney. The ship master was Henry Hardy.

References 

Shipwrecks of the Hunter Region
Ships built in New South Wales
1853 ships
Maritime incidents in July 1860
1851–1870 ships of Australia
Merchant ships of Australia
Cutters of Australia